Fitness for Living is an educational series of three short films produced in 1982 by Walt Disney Educational to explain fitness.  This series was a live-action series.

How to Get Fit, guide for students to stay in shape
Measuring Up, explanation of the steps in the fitness
What is Physical Fitness? Explanation of the effects of sport on the body

References

Disney documentary films
Disney educational films
Disney short film series
1982 films
1980s educational films
1980s American films